Gudrun Schmidt (born 7 February 1941) is a German former cross-country skier. She competed in three events at the 1968 Winter Olympics, representing East Germany.

Cross-country skiing results

Olympic Games

References

External links
 

1941 births
Living people
German female cross-country skiers
Olympic cross-country skiers of East Germany
Cross-country skiers at the 1968 Winter Olympics
People from Greiz (district)
Sportspeople from Thuringia